Houwald family (also Houvalt, Ubald, Haubal, Haubalt, Huwald) is an aristocratic German noble family originating from Saxony.

Notable people
 (1601–1661), mercenary soldier from Saxony  with a prominent career
Christoph Ernst von Houwald (1778–1845), German dramatist and author
 (1807–1884), Prussian count and statesman
 (1844–1903)
 (1816–1883), German civil servant
 (1901–1974), German painter
Götz von Houwald (1913–2001), German diplomat, historian and ethnographer
Houvalt family were the owners of the town of Maišiagala, Lithuania

See also
Howald (surname)
Ubald
Ubaldo

References

Saxony
German families